Adam Kubert (born 1959) is an American comics artist known for his work for publishers such as Marvel Comics and DC Comics, including work on Action Comics, Astonishing Spider-Man & Wolverine, The Incredible Hulk, Ultimate Fantastic Four, Ultimate X-Men, and Wolverine.

Kubert was rated by Wizard magazine as one of the "Hot 10 Writers and Artists" in the industry in 2008. He is the son of Joe Kubert and brother of Andy Kubert, both comic book artists as well, and the uncle of comics editor Katie Kubert. Born in Dover, New Jersey he is an instructor at the Joe Kubert School located there, which Joe Kubert founded, and at which he and Andy studied.

Early life
Adam Kubert was born in 1959, the son of Muriel (née Fogelson) and Joe Kubert. His siblings include a sister, Lisa, and brothers David, Daniel, and Andrew. Comics editor Katie Kubert is his niece. He and his siblings grew up in Dover, New Jersey. He began his professional comics career at age 12 as a letterer. He attended the Rochester Institute of Technology and graduated with a degree in medical illustration. He subsequently attended his father's The Kubert School in Dover, New Jersey.

Career
Adam Kubert began his comics career as a letterer for DC Comics. His first credited artwork for the company is the story "Gremlins" published in Sgt. Rock #394 (Nov. 1984). In 1988, Adam Kubert drew the Jezebel Jade limited series, a spin-off from the Jonny Quest series, for Comico. He collaborated with his brother on Adam Strange (1990) and the Batman Versus Predator intercompany crossover (1992).

Marvel Comics

Adam Kubert is known for his work at Marvel Comics. From 1993 to 1996 he illustrated 17 issues of writer Larry Hama's run on Wolverine between issues #75 to 102. His first issue on the series featured the aftereffects of Magneto removing the adamantium from Wolverine's body. Kubert drew the Weapon X limited series as part of the "Age of Apocalypse" storyline in 1995. The following year, he drew the Onslaught: X-Men and Onslaught: Marvel Universe one-shots which lead into the "Heroes Reborn" crossover. From 1997 to 1998 he illustrated 12 issues of Peter David's run on The Incredible Hulk from #454 to 467, as well as the -1 issue (July 1997). From late 1998 to early 1999 Kubert drew X-Men #81 - 84, on which he was teamed up with European colorist Richard Isanove, who subsequently followed Kubert to Ultimate X-Men, employing the pencils-to-color approach seen on most of Ultimate X-Men covers.

In 2001, Kubert drew the new Ultimate X-Men title, penciling the first four issues, and then illustrating 16 various issues beginning with #7, before leaving the title with issue #33 (July 2003). In 2004, he began a run on Ultimate Fantastic Four, once again with writers Mark Millar and Brian Michael Bendis, illustrating that series' first six issues, and then issues 13-18.

DC Comics
Both Kubert and his brother Andy signed exclusive contracts with DC Comics in June 2005. Kubert's first project for DC was illustrating "Last Son", a Superman story arc co-written by Geoff Johns and Richard Donner, which ran in Action Comics #844–847, 851 and Action Comics Annual #11. Further delay forced DC Comics to bring in substitute creative teams and delay the fourth part of the "Last Son" storyline and the 3D issue to #851, which was released in early July 2007. The final part of the storyline was in Action Comics Annual #11. Following his work on Superman he penciled the "Final Crisis" tie-in, DC Universe: Last Will and Testament, written by Brad Meltzer.<ref>{{cite web |url= http://www.comicbookresources.com/?page=article&id=16693|title= Meltzer Bridges Final Crisis with Last Will and Testament'|first= Jeffrey|last= Renaud|date= June 4, 2008|website= Comic Book Resources|archive-url= https://web.archive.org/web/20121006203545/http://www.comicbookresources.com/?page=article&id=16693|archive-date= October 6, 2012|url-status= live|df=mdy-all}}</ref>

His last work for his latest tenure at DC was the Batman and The Outsiders Special, released in February 2009. This issue, written by Peter Tomasi, highlighted Alfred Pennyworth's efforts to recruit a new team of Outsiders in the wake of Batman's apparent death. After the release of the comic book, Kubert said he was pleased with his work at DC and had done, "what [he] set out to do," which was to draw Superman.

Return to Marvel
May 2009 marked Adam Kubert's return to Marvel, his first interior work being published as one of two stories in Wolverine #73 and 74. Following this he contributed several covers to New Mutants and Wolverine: Weapon X, and penciled the "Dark Reign" tie in, The List: Amazing Spider-Man.

When he returned to penciling for Marvel, he continued to do some work for DC, contributing the stories for the Wednesday Comics "Sgt. Rock" feature, drawn by his father. He has since stated that he is Marvel-exclusive, but they are allowed him to work on the "Sgt. Rock" feature as he had signed on to do it before his contract at DC had expired. Kubert's next job was providing pencils on Astonishing Spider-Man & Wolverine. In 2012, Kubert penciled issues #8–10 and #12 of the Marvel crossover miniseries Avengers vs. X-Men. He then drew issues #4–6 of Jonathan Hickman's run on The Avengers.

In June 2017, Kubert began penciling Peter Parker: The Spectacular Spider-Man written by Chip Zdarsky. The revamped title being billed as a “back-to-basics” approach for the character.

In February 2020, Kubert and writer Benjamin Percy were the creative team on a new Wolverine series that debuted as part of the Marvel's Dawn of X relaunch the X-Men line of comics. The series was Wolverine's first ongoing series since his resurrection following the Hunt For Wolverine one-shot and Return of Wolverine miniseries. Issue #1 was best-selling comic for the month of February 2020.

Teaching work
Kubert and his brother Andy teach at The Kubert School, which was founded by their father, who also taught there before his passing in 2012.

Awards
1992 Eisner Award for Best Inker for Batman Versus PredatorBibliography
Interior work
Comico Comics
 Jezebel Jade #1–3 (1988)
 Jonny Quest #6 (1986)

DC Comics
 Action Comics #844–846, 851, Annual #11 (2006–2008)
 Adam Strange #1–3 (1990) 
 Batman & the Outsiders Special #1 (2009) 
 Batman Versus Predator #1–3 (1992) 
 Clash #1–3 (1991–1992) 
 DC Universe: Last Will and Testament #1 (2008) 
 Doc Savage #1–4 (1987–1988) 
 Justice League of America vol. 2 #0 (2006) 
 Sgt. Rock #394, 401, 417, 422 (1984–1988)
 Star Trek #38 (1987) 
 The Warlord #95, 99–100, Annual #5 (1985–1986)
 Wednesday Comics (Sgt. Rock) (writer) (2009)

Marvel Comics

 All-New, All-Different Avengers #1–3, 7–8, 13–15 (2015–2016)
 Astonishing Spider-Man & Wolverine #1–6 (2010–2011)The Avengers vol. 5 #4-6 (2013)Avengers vs. X-Men #8-10, 12 (2012)AvX: Vs. #1 (2012)
 Avengers & X-Men: Axis #1–2, 7 (2014)
 Captain America #7-12 (2019)
 Civil War II #8 (2016)
 Dark Reign: The List – The Amazing Spider-Man #1 (2010) 
 Dark Web #1 (2022)
 Dark Web Finale #1 (2023)Fear Itself: Thor #7.2 (2012)
 Ghost Rider/Blaze: Spirits of Vengeance #1–10, 12–13 (1992–1993) 
 The Incredible Hulk vol. 2 #454, -1, 455–456, 458–460, 462–464, 466–467 (1997–1998)
 The Incredible Hulk vol. 3 #87 (2005)
 Mark Hazzard: Merc #9 (1987) 
 Monsters Unleashed #5 (2017)
 Onslaught: Marvel Universe #1 (1996) 
 Onslaught: X-Men #1 (1996) 
 Origin II #1–5 (2014) 
 The Spectacular Spider-Man #1–5, 297–300, 304-307 (2017–2018) 
 Ultimate Fantastic Four #1–6, 13–18 (2004–2005)
 Ultimate X-Men #1–8, 10–12, 15–17, 20–22, 25, 29, 31–33 (2001–2003) 
 Uncanny X-Men #339, 368–370, 372–373, 375, 378, 381, 383–384 (1996–2000) 
 Weapon X #1–4 (1995)
 Wolverine vol. 2 #75, 77–79, 81–82, 85, 87–88, 90, 92–93, 95–97, 100, 102 (1993–1996)
 Wolverine vol. 3 #73–74 (2009) 
 Wolverine vol. 7 #1–3, 8-10, 14-16, 20-23 (2020-2022)
 X-Men vol. 2 #81–84 (1998–1999) X-Men: Schism #5 (2011)
 X-Men 2099 #1–3 (1993) 

Cover work
Marvel Comics

 All New Captain America #1 (2015)
 All-New Wolverine #19 (2016)
 All-New X-Men vol. 2 #1 (2012)
 Astonishing X-Men vol. 4 #14 (2017)
 Avengers vol. 7 #1 (variant cover only) (2012)
 Blink #1–3 (2001)
 Cable vol. 3 #1 (variant cover only) (2017)
 Daredevil vol. 3 #25 (variant cover only) (2014)
 Ghost Rider vol. 7 #1 (2015)
 Guardians of the Galaxy vol. 3 #8 (variant cover only) (2013)
 X-Men: hellfire club #4 (2000)
 Infinity #1-6 (2013)
 New Mutants vol. 3 #6 (2009)
 Spider-Man/Deadpool #1 (variant cover only) (2016)
 Uncanny Avengers vol. 3 #20-21 (2015)
 Uncanny X-Men #377 (2016)
 Wolverine: Weapon X''  #10 (2017)

References

External links

 
 Adam Kubert at The Kubert School
 Adam Kubert at Mike's Amazing World of Comics
 Adam Kubert at the Unofficial Handbook of Marvel Comics Creators

1959 births
American comics artists
American comics writers
American people of Polish-Jewish descent
American art educators
Artists from New Jersey
Eisner Award winners for Best Penciller/Inker or Penciller/Inker Team
Jewish American artists
Living people
Marvel Comics people
People from Dover, New Jersey
Rochester Institute of Technology alumni
The Kubert School alumni
Educators from New Jersey